Clermont was a Legislative Assembly electorate in the state of Queensland. The electorate was based on the town of Clermont and surrounding areas.

History
In 1864, the Additional Members Act created six additional electoral districts, each returning 1 member:
 Clermont
 Kennedy
 Maryborough
 Mitchell
 Rockhampton
 Warrego

The first elections in these six electorates were held in 1865 (that is, during a parliamentary term and not as part of a general election across Queensland). The nomination date for the election in Clermont was 18 February 1865 and the election was held on 18 March 1865.

The electoral district of Clermont was abolished in 1910 when the area was
incorporated into the Electoral district of Leichhardt.

Members

The following people represented this electorate:

See also
 Electoral districts of Queensland
 Members of the Queensland Legislative Assembly by year
 :Category:Members of the Queensland Legislative Assembly by name

References

Former electoral districts of Queensland
Constituencies established in 1865
Constituencies disestablished in 1912
1865 establishments in Australia
1912 disestablishments in Australia